Penicillium svalbardense is a species of fungus in the genus Penicillium which was isolated from arctic glacial ice.

References

Further reading 
 

svalbardense
Fungi described in 2007